The JPMorgan Chase Tower, formerly Texas Commerce Tower, is a , , 75-story skyscraper at 600 Travis Street in Downtown Houston, Texas, United States. It is currently the tallest building in Texas and the South Central region of the United States, the tallest five-sided building in the world, the 29th-tallest building in the United States, and the 107th-tallest building in the world.

Overview 
The tower was built between 1979 and 1981 as the Texas Commerce Tower.  It was designed by noted architects I. M. Pei & Partners.  Architect of Record was 3D/International Inc.  In some early plans, the building reached up to 80 stories; however, the FAA expressed concerns that additional height was a risk for aircraft going into and out of nearby William P. Hobby Airport. Nonetheless, when it was completed, it was the sixth-tallest building in the United States and the eighth-tallest building in the world. The building was developed as part of a partnership between Texas Commerce Bank and Khalid bin Mahfouz. It was built on the site where the Uptown Theatre, demolished in 1965, once stood.

Upon its completion, the building surpassed Aon Center in Los Angeles to become the tallest building in the United States west of the Mississippi River, a title it held until Los Angeles's Library Tower, now known as the U.S. Bank Tower, was built in 1990.

JPMorgan Chase Tower is connected to the Houston Downtown Tunnel System. This system forms a network of subterranean, climate-controlled, pedestrian walkways that link twenty-five full city blocks. The lobby of JPMorgan Chase Tower has been designed to harmonize not only with the height of the structure but also with the portico of Jones Hall, home of the Houston Symphony Orchestra, and which occupies the city block immediately to the west.  For that reason, a five-story glass wall supported by a stainless steel space frame spans the entire 85-foot width of the front entrance, making the lobby area light and airy, and opening up the space to the plaza outside.. The Tower also includes  of retail space.

The sky lobby observation deck is located on the 60th floor. The sky lobby acts as a transfer point for persons traveling to the upper (61–75) floors, but also as an observation deck for the building tenants. The sky lobby is now permanently closed to the public and is only accessible by tenants. In the large plaza area at the entrance of the building is a multi-colored sculpture entitled "Personage with Birds", which was designed by painter and sculptor Joan Miró, and which was installed in the plaza in early 1982.

While the tower's name reflects the bank JPMorgan Chase, the only space designated to Chase was a single branch office on the bottom floor until 2021. The tower is owned by Prime Asset Management and managed by its original owner, Hines Interests.

Hurricane Ike
On September 13, 2008, many of the tower's windows were blown out as Hurricane Ike struck the city, leaving desks exposed, metal blinds hanging in twisted heaps, and smoky black glass covering the streets below.  Police were forced to cordon off the area due to the amount of debris in the streets.

At first, it was speculated that the glass came off the building due to impact from debris or due to high-speed winds in the confined spaces.  However, flying glass debris must be entirely governed by drag and lift forces that overcome gravity for a considerable time period.  Also, the high-wind-speed-in-confined-spaces theory is not entirely justified since the height of damage seen in the tower exceeded too significantly the height of the Chase Center parking garage next to the tower.  This theory was proposed because an increase in wind speed produces a drop in external pressure.  This drop in pressure at the side and leeward walls, combined with the normal, higher pressure inside the building would result in a force that could possibly overcome design pressures causing the window to separate. Other theories included those of ABS Consulting Engineers, who suggested that glazing damage may have been produced by "organized" vortices produced by the upwind Calpine Center and steady vortices between the Tower and the Chase Center parking garage.

The NatHaz Modeling Laboratory at the University of Notre Dame is currently conducting an investigation of the flow field around the structure, modeling the tower and the immediate area surrounding it using computational fluid dynamics (CFD). Preliminary findings suggest that the localized damage is the result of a confluence of multiple mechanisms arising from the arrangement of nearby buildings, critical flow directionality and the possible entrapment of debris within evolving flow structures.

Fictional portrayals

 The building stood in for the headquarters of the fictional "Knox Oil & Gas Company" in the 1983 film Local Hero.
 The building stood in as the fictional location of Charles C. Foster's law office of in the 2009 film Mao's Last Dancer.

Gallery

See also

 List of tallest buildings in Houston
 List of tallest buildings by U.S. state
 List of tallest buildings in Texas
 List of tallest buildings in the United States
 Gulf Building (Houston)

References

External links

 JP Morgan Chase Tower Official Site
 Video of the after effects of Hurricane Ike on the JPMorgan Chase Tower

Office buildings completed in 1982
Skyscraper office buildings in Houston
I. M. Pei buildings
JPMorgan Chase buildings
1982 establishments in Texas